Ixora raiateensis is a species of flowering plant in the family Rubiaceae. It is endemic to Raiatea in French Polynesia, hence its name.

References

External links
World Checklist of Rubiaceae

raiateensis
Flora of French Polynesia
Near threatened plants
Taxonomy articles created by Polbot